The Wakapuaka River is a river of the Nelson Region of New Zealand's South Island.

The main tributaries of the Wakapuaka River are the Lud River and Teal River.

Fishing 
The Wakapuaka River is a popular fishing setting. Due to heavy fishing, visitors are limited to only two bags of fish per trip. Fishing season is from 1 October to 30 April. Twelve species of freshwater fish inhabit the area. These are the longfin eel, shortfin eel, common bully, redfin bully, giant bully, upland bully, inanga (also known as common galaxias), koaro (also known as climbing galaxias), brown trout, torrentfish, cockabully, and freshwater crayfish.

See also
List of rivers of New Zealand

References

Further reading

The district

Rivers of the Nelson Region
Rivers of New Zealand